Lachlan Buchanan is an Australian actor.

Biography
Buchanan was born on April 25, 1987 in Australia and grew up in Maleny, Queensland. He attended Maleny State School and Matthew Flinders Anglican College. Buchanan acted in soap operas such as Home and Away. He has also acted in several films, with supporting roles in Arcadia Lost and All My Friends Are Leaving Brisbane, and as a lead in Newcastle.

Buchanan played Scott Mitchell in the first CMT sitcom Working Class, which premiered in January 2011.

He is an experienced surfer, and did half of his surfing scenes in Newcastle himself. He is fluent in French. As of 2010, he is based in Los Angeles.

In 2015, Buchanan starred in the low-budget film Muck, released in March. Buchanan was cast in the role of Kyle Abbott on the American soap opera The Young and the Restless. His first scene aired on 25 February 2015.

In January 2016, Buchanan was announced to guest-star in one episode of MTV's Teen Wolf, as Henri Argent. Henri is a recluse who lives in a forest grove and has been described as "wise but guarded". Being an Argent, Henri is said to know a lot about the supernatural world.

In an April 2020 interview with Queerty, Buchanan identified himself as a queer man, but did not specify any further than that.

Filmography

References

External links

Living people
Australian male actors
Australian people of Scottish descent
Australian emigrants to the United States
1987 births
Queer actors
Australian LGBT actors